Yōko Hagiwara  was a Japanese writer. She wrote extensively about her family.

Biography 
Hagiwara was born in Tokyo on September 4, 1920. Her father was Sakutarō Hagiwara. Hagiwara's younger sister became brain damaged from meningitis in 1927, and her mother left her father in 1929. Her mother's abandonment left her with trauma that influenced her later writing. Hagiwara married a civil servant in 1944, and they had a child, the cinematographer . She studied at Kokugakuin University from 1949 to 1952. She divorced her husband in 1953.

Hagiwara's writing career began with a book of essays published in 1959. It was called , and won the Japan Essayist Club Award. Her next major work was titled  and was published in 1966. It was a biographical novel about Tatsuji Miyoshi, a poet who had courted Hagiwara's aunt, Ai Hagiwara. It was adapted into a film starring Masahiro Higashide in 2022. Many of Hagiwara's novels were about her family and their internal struggles, from her father's extended family almost throwing her out of the house after his death, her escape into a marriage, her dissatisfaction within that marriage, and the difficult relationship she had with her mother after Hagiwara found her in Hokkaido.

Researcher Sachiko Schierbeck notes that Hagiwara's popularity comes from her "frank depictions of the shadier sides of life" and her informal writing style.

Hagiwara died on July 1, 2005 in Tokyo.

Selected works 

 , 1959
 , 1966
 , 1983
 , 1984

References 

1920 births
2005 deaths
20th-century Japanese writers
Writers from Tokyo